Dina is a genus of annelids belonging to the family Erpobdellidae.

The species of this genus are found in Europe and Western Asia.

Species:

Dina absoloni 
Dina anoculata 
Dina apathyi 
Dina dubia 
Dina eturpshem 
Dina farsa 
Dina krasensis 
Dina krilata 
Dina kuzmani 
Dina latestriata 
Dina lepinja 
Dina lineata

References

Annelids